Sylvain Meslien (born August 7, 1980 in Bondy, Seine-Saint-Denis) is a French professional football player, who currently plays in the Championnat de France amateur 2 for FC Saint-Louis Neuweg. He is also a coach at Bartlomé Soccer Academy in Basel and coaches alongside Chris Hartmann and Chad Bartlomé (CEO of Bartlomé Soccer Academy).

Career
He played on the professional level in Ligue 1 for AS Saint-Étienne, Ligue 2 for AS Saint-Étienne and Troyes AC and in the Football League One for Swansea City A.F.C.

Notes

1980 births
Living people
Sportspeople from Bondy
French footballers
French expatriate footballers
Expatriate footballers in England
Ligue 1 players
Ligue 2 players
Championnat National players
Championnat National 2 players
AS Saint-Étienne players
ES Troyes AC players
Swansea City A.F.C. players
Pau FC players
SR Colmar players
FC Saint-Louis Neuweg players
Association football defenders
Footballers from Seine-Saint-Denis